Sultan Muhammad Shah ibni Almarhum Sultan Ibrahim Shah, (Jawi: سلطان محمد شاه ابن المرحوم سلطان إبراهيم شاه ; born Raja Muhammad bin Raja Ibrahim; 1772 – 6 January 1857) was the third Sultan of Selangor. His reign lasted 31 years until his death and saw the opening of tin mines in Ampang and the separation of Selangor into five independent districts. His actions of providing land to his family eventually caused the Klang War.

Reign
Muhammad Shah was not the son of his father's first wife, but since he was made the heir presumptive during his father's reign, Selangor dignitaries accepted him as the next Sultan of Selangor. Sultan Muhammad Shah was not as competent in governing the state and did not have total control over local rajas, village leaders or their districts. By the end of his rule, Selangor was separated into five individual territories, namely Bernam, Kuala Selangor, Kelang, Langat and Lukut. Each area was governed by different leaders and Muhammad Shah only controlled Kuala Selangor. Chinese settlers started mining for tin in the state during his time. The setting up of tin mines in Ampang brought business to the people and this was to be his only recognised success.

His initial giving of the Klang region to Raja Sulaiman (his son from a concubine) but then later cancelling the gift and then bestowing it on Raja Abdullah (his son in-law) would later cause resentment between the two parties and would lead to the Klang War between Raja Abdullah and Raja Mahdi (son of Raja Sulaiman).

Family
He was the son of Sultan Ibrahim Shah by his wife, Cik Puan Besar Encik Long Halijah binti Dato' Hussain. He was the father-in-law of Abdul Samad, the 4th Sultan of Selangor who was married to Sultan Muhammad's daughter, Raja Atfah. Which makes Sultan Muhammad the great-grand maternal grandfather of Sultan Sultan Sulaiman.

References 

1804 births
Malaysian people of Bugis descent
1857 deaths
Malaysian people of Malay descent
Muhammad Shah
19th-century monarchs in Asia